Lady Tree Lodge is a rustic cottage that was built about 1896 as part of Saranac Inn, and later used as summer residence by Texas newspaper publisher A. H. Belo and New York governor Charles Evans Hughes.  It is at the northern end of Upper Saranac Lake. It was added to the National Register of Historic Places in 2018.

References

Houses on the National Register of Historic Places in New York (state)
National Register of Historic Places in Franklin County, New York

 01
Buildings and structures in Franklin County, New York
1890s establishments in New York (state)